CommutAir Flight 4933 (operating as United Express Flight 4933) was a domestic regional flight operating from Newark, New Jersey, to Presque Isle, Maine, in the United States. The flight was operated by CommutAir under the United Express brand. On March 4, 2019, the Embraer EMB-145XR operating the flight touched down in a snow-covered grassy area to the right of the runway at Presque Isle International Airport, injuring three aircraft occupants and substantially damaging the aircraft. The accident was attributed to confirmation bias which prompted the flight crew to continue descending even though they could not see the runway due to snow; poor decision-making by the captain, fatigue of the first officer, and problems with the airport's instrument landing system were identified as contributing factors.

Background

Aircraft

The aircraft was a 14-year-old Embraer EMB-145XR first delivered to ExpressJet in October 2004, for Continental Express. From June 2007 to October 2008, the aircraft was operating for Delta Connection before operating once again for Continental Express until October 2010 when it commenced operations for United Express. In August 2016, the aircraft was transferred to CommutAir.

Crew
The aircraft had three crew members (two pilots and a flight attendant). The aircraft was piloted by a 40-year-old captain who joined CommutAir in March 2013 before working for another air carrier in November 2015. She returned in May 2016. She had accumulated a total of 5,655 flight hours, 1,044 of them on the Embraer EMB-145XR. The first officer was 51 years old and joined CommutAir in May 2018. He had accumulated a total of 4,909 flight hours, 470 on the Embraer EMB-145XR.

Accident
Flight 4933 departed from Newark Liberty International Airport around 10:04 Eastern Standard Time (EST) (14:04 UTC). The initial part of the flight was uneventful. At 11:01 EST, Boston Air Route Traffic Control Center cleared the aircraft to land on runway 1 at Presque Isle, and the pilots initiated an instrument landing system (ILS) approach. The first officer was the pilot flying and the captain was the pilot monitoring. Instrument meteorological conditions (IMC) prevailed at the airfield, with low ceilings, fog, and blowing snow. The runway had been plowed about ten minutes earlier.  At around 11:10 EST, according to cockpit voice recorder (CVR) transcripts, the pilots were having trouble seeing the runway clearly and attempted to turn on the runway lights by cuing the radio microphone. During the ensuing approach, both pilots said they saw the runway, albeit with difficulty due to snow. The first officer then spotted a tower near the aircraft's position, and realizing that the aircraft was not aligned properly with the runway, he initiated a missed approach. Airport maintenance staff later reported that the runway lights were not illuminated at the time.

The aircraft ascended from a minimum altitude of  mean sea level (MSL) [ above ground level (AGL)] to around  MSL. At 11:16 EST, the pilots contacted airport staff to verify that the runway lights were turned on at maximum brightness; the staff turned on the lights at the brightest setting. The captain told the first officer that she could see the runway lights but "it's really white down there that’s the problem." The first officer commenced a second approach and verified that the aircraft was aligned with the ILS localizer. At 11:28 EST, as the aircraft descended through  AGL, the minimum decision height for the approach, the captain called out "runway in sight twelve o'clock." The first officer stated "I'm staying on the flight director 'cause I don't see it yet", and the captain responded by repeating the phrase "stay in it", followed by "what the [expletive]" and the first officer saying "I don’t know what I’m seein'." The aircraft touched down at 11:29 EST and came to rest in a snow-covered grassy area between the runway and a parallel taxiway.

CommutAir and the Federal Aviation Administration (FAA) initially reported that the aircraft had touched down on the runway and then slid off, but the National Transportation Safety Board (NTSB) later clarified that the aircraft had missed the runway entirely.

The aircraft was substantially damaged and was subsequently written off as a result. It came to rest with the left main landing gear assembly sheared off and wedged between the rear fuselage and the left engine. Five people were taken to the hospital including the first officer and two passengers who received minor injuries from the accident. The airport was closed in reaction to the accident.

Investigation
The final report was released by the NTSB on July 12, 2022, more than 3 years after the accident. The NTSB concluded that the probable cause of the accident was confirmation bias which prompted the crew to continue descending even though they had not positively identified the runway.

Weather

In a post crash interview, the first officer of the flight stated that when he transitioned from looking at his flight instruments to the outside, all he could see was "white on white".

Crew
The NTSB identified the first officer's lack of sleep as a contributing factor. He had been recently suffering from the flu and had lost sleep, and had made only limited and inconsistent use of his prescribed continuous positive airway pressure machine for several days leading to the accident. He had not gone to sleep until around 1:00 EST the night before the accident due to flight and shuttle delays during the preceding workday, and he had only slept until 6:00 EST, about five hours, whereas he usually slept for about eight hours.

The NTSB commented on the captain's flight training record. While she had been a de Havilland Canada DHC-8 first officer with CommutAir, she had received a disciplinary letter and been subject to nine months of monitoring before being allowed to pursue captain upgrade training. She failed her EMB-145 checkride during her initial attempt and was later placed under "increased scrutiny" by CommutAir twice. Although she had subsequently received her EMB-145 type rating and been upgraded to captain, the NTSB said that "her repeated training problems indicated an inadequate foundation for being a captain, which CommutAir did not effectively address."

Localizer
About 36 hours before the accident, a CommutAir flight crew had noticed the lateral localizer error and reported it to the Boston Air Route Traffic Control Center; however, FAA procedures dictated that before a navigational aid malfunction could be officially reported, a second independent report of the error was needed, which had not been received. Airport maintenance staff did not have the means to measure localizer alignment directly. FAA guidance before the accident did not specifically address snow depth around a localizer antenna; after the accident, the guidance was revised to state that localizer alignment should be checked if snow accumulated to a depth exceeding 

The NTSB found that at least six CommutAir pilots had noticed the localizer misalignment within the preceding five days before the accident but none had filed a company aviation safety action program (ASAP) report; however, four of them filed ASAP reports after the accident. The CommutAir managing director of safety could not state a reason why the reports were not filed earlier.

References

Notes

Citations

2019 in Maine
Aviation accidents and incidents in the United States in 2019
Airliner accidents and incidents in Maine
4933
March 2019 events in the United States
Airliner accidents and incidents caused by pilot error
Aviation accidents and incidents involving runway excursions
Aviation accidents and incidents involving controlled flight into terrain